Below is a list of television-related events in 1989.

Events
December 1988 / January – Young Talent Time was rested by Network Ten during the Cricket / Australian Open season. One week into January 1989 the network announced that the show would not return. Reasons given for YTT's axing are very bad ratings. It was unable to match its rivals from Seven or Nine.
January – Nine Network launches two brand new daytime talk shows: In Melbourne Today and In Sydney Today, which later merge to become Ernie and Denise.
January – Seven Network purchases the Australian television rights to the 1992 Barcelona Olympics for $40 million.
13 January – American police drama series Hill Street Blues switches over to broadcast on ABC.
25 January – Network Ten debuts a brand new evening drama series: E Street (1989–1993).
30 January – Network Ten launches a brand new local morning series called Til Ten (1989–1991) hosted by Andrew Harwood and Joan McInnes.
6 February – The Afternoon Show (1987–1993) returns to the ABC for another year with a brand new lineup of two programmes presented by James Valentine. The two programmes include the debut of the British children's animated series Count Duckula and a repeat of the very first episode of Doctor Who to feature Tom Baker, Robot.
11 February – Long running Australian soap opera Home and Away starts airing in the UK for the very first time on ITV.
13 February – Australian investigative journalism/current affairs program Four Corners (1961–present) returns to the ABC for another year with Andrew Olle as presenter once again.
14 February – A brand new Australian sitcom called The Family Business (1989) starring Shane Withington debuts on Network Ten. The series ran for only one season and 13 episodes.
14 February – American sitcom Roseanne premieres on Network Ten.
28 February – A brand new live comedy series The Big Gig premieres on ABC (1989–1992).
28 February – Australian miniseries Edens Lost debuts on ABC at 8:30pm. The series only ran for three episodes and was shown on three days and one week with a budget of only $A3.9 million.
6 March – The Adventures of Spot, a British children's animated TV series based on the books by Eric Hill and aimed at pre-schoolers, debuts on the ABC.
7 March – Australian drama series G.P. (1989–1996) debuts on the ABC.
13 March – Australian version of the children's game show Double Dare (1989–1992) airs on Network Ten.
15 March – First episode of the new Australian police drama Police Rescue (1989–1996) airs on the ABC.
17 March – Bert Newton hosts the TV Week Logie Awards, telecast on the Seven Network for the first time.
20 March – The Bert Newton Show and new soap opera The Power, The Passion launch on the Seven Network, only shown for a few months, but later cancelled after a strong competition win with Midday with Ray Martin.
23 March – Long running Australian soap opera Home and Away begins airing on British forces television on BFBS and SSVC Television. The networks have transmitted the show in a range of countries including Germany, Cyprus and the Falkland Islands.
31 March – Phase 1 of Aggregation of television services occurs in Southern NSW, with WIN Television becoming a regional Nine Network affiliate, Prime Television becoming the Seven Network affiliate & Capital Television (now Southern Cross Ten) becoming the Network Ten affiliate.
April – American TV executive Bob Shanks is hired by Network Ten to lift its ailing ratings.
12 April – Accident-prone sketch comedy Fast Forward starring Steve Vizard, Marg Downey, Jane Turner, Gina Riley, Magda Szubanski (Kath & Kim) premieres on Seven Network (1989–1992).
1 May – Australian children's programme Swap Shop returns to the ABC for a brand new series.
6 May – Final episode of the Australian music television series The Factory (1987–1989) is broadcast on the Australian Broadcasting Corporation at 9:00am.
8 May – Australian media analysis television program Media Watch (1989–2000, 2002–present) presented by Stuart Littlemore debuts on the ABC airing on Monday nights.
8 May – Australian 7 episode sitcom Dearest Enemy starring Grigor Taylor, Frank Wilson and Bruce Spence premieres on ABC.
26 May – Neighbours launches a newly revised theme song, with an overload of new cast members who will be "boned" or "suspended" from the soap indefinitely between now and 1994. Between August and November 1989 Neighbours suffered poor ratings with 290,000 national viewers compared to Seven's Home and Away 1,500,000 nationally. The new-look and re-recorded Neighbours theme was again sung by Barry Crocker, which was used until mid-1992.
13 June – Australian children's sitcom Pugwall (1989–1991) debuts on the Nine Network.
16 June – SBS launches a new television series called Eat Carpet (1989–2005). Hosted by Annette Shun Wah who was also the host of SBS's other television series MC Tee Vee and The Noise
3 July – A new nightly version of the former long-running weekly Australian music television show Countdown airs on ABC with a new title Countdown Revolution hosted by Andy McLean, Lisa Collins and Daniel Woods. The show itself received a modest following and was axed the following year.
22 July – American animated series ThunderCats airs on Seven Network in Victoria for the first time.
23 July – After poor ratings, disgraced network Network Ten is relaunched as 10 TV Australia, introducing a new lineup with increased game show content. Most of the new shows are axed by the end of the year following bad ratings.
29 July – Australian game show The Price is Right, again hosted by Ian Turpie, returns to television airing on 10 TV Australia at 7:30pm on Saturdays as part of the network's attempted revamp. Despite the show returning, only 12 episodes were lasted in the face of stiff competition of AFL coverage on most-watched rival Channel Seven.
9 August – Greek-Australian sitcom, Acropolis Now premieres on Seven Network in Australia (1989–1992).
September – Network Ten is sold to Steve Cosser, head of Broadcom Australia, for $22 million.
14 September – After very nasty ratings, the final episode of the Australian game show The Price is Right airs on 10 TV Australia.
9 October – Neighbours, Australian television's long running soap opera has been snapped up for television broadcasting in Germany when the series begins airing on Sat. 1 with the title beginning translated to Nachbarn.
21 October – British science fiction sitcom Red Dwarf premieres on ABC.
22 October – The 1985 film Back to the Future starring Michael J. Fox and Christopher Lloyd premieres on 10 TV Australia.
November – Jacki MacDonald quits Hey Hey It's Saturday after 11 years. McDonald is replaced by Denise Drysdale when the show returns in 1990.
17 November – Australian dating game show Perfect Match airs its final episode on 10 TV Australia. The show was cancelled due to poor ratings, failing to match the success of its 1984 series, which broke records for 5:30pm.
December – The Seven Network wins the 1989 ratings year with a record of 34.0% share.
5 December – Australian soap opera Home and Away begins its very first broadcast in New Zealand on the country's already newly launched channel TV3.
16 December – The late Australian rock musician Brad Robinson of Australian Crawl fame presents a brand new Australia music program on 10 TV Australia called Spin.
31 December – Phase 2 of Aggregation of Television services occurs in Orange & Wagga Wagga, with aggregation occurring in Wollongong and Canberra in March.

Television

Debuts

New international programming

Changes to network affiliation
This is a list of programs which made their premiere on an Australian television network that had previously premiered on another Australian television network. The networks involved in the switch of allegiances are predominantly both free-to-air networks or both subscription television networks. Programs that have their free-to-air/subscription television premiere, after previously premiering on the opposite platform (free-to air to subscription/subscription to free-to air) are not included. In some cases, programs may still air on the original television network. This occurs predominantly with programs shared between subscription television networks.

Domestic

International

Television shows

1950s
 Mr. Squiggle and Friends (1959–1999)

1960s
 Four Corners (1961–present)

1970s
 Hey Hey It's Saturday (1971–1999)
 60 Minutes (1979–present)

1980s
 Sale of the Century (1980–2001)
 Wheel of Fortune (1981–1996, 1996–2003, 2004–08)
 Sunday (1981–2008)
 The Price is Right (1981–1985, 1989, 1993–1998, 2003–2005, 2012)
 Today (1982–present)
 Neighbours (1985–present)
 The Flying Doctors (1986–1993)
 Rage (1987–present)
 Home and Away (1988–present)
 Seven's Super Saturday (1988–1990)
 The Comedy Company (1988–1990)
 Fast Forward (1989–1992)
 The Big Gig (1989–1991)
 G.P. (1989–1996)
 Til Ten (1989–1991)

Ending this year

Returning this year

See also
 1989 in Australia
 List of Australian films of 1989

References